The ExpressTram is an automated people mover system operating at Detroit Metropolitan Wayne County Airport, in Romulus, Michigan, USA.  The driverless system transports passengers along Concourse A of the airport's Edward H. McNamara Terminal, which is the world's second-longest airport concourse. Detroit Metro Airport serves as the second largest hub for Delta Air Lines, after Atlanta.

History

Plans were announced for the McNamara Terminal in 1996 by Wayne County and Northwest Airlines, who operated their largest hub in Detroit at the time.  The McNamara Terminal was designed to accommodate Northwest's hub operation, which was previously housed in the airport's Davey Terminal.  As part of the design, a people mover on the upper level of Concourse A was planned to help transport passengers quickly thorough the 4,900-foot (0.93-mile) concourse.  The people mover, which was eventually named ExpressTram, was the world's first airport people mover to operate on the inside of a terminal building, and not outdoors or in tunnels like other airports.

The ExpressTram entered service when the McNamara Terminal opened on February 24, 2002.  The two trams on the system were painted red because Northwest Airlines' primary branding color was red.  Northwest merged with Delta Air Lines in 2010, who continues to operate the Detroit hub. Despite the merger, the trams have retained their red color, but new Delta logos replace the Northwest ones.

The trams were refurbished in early 2019.

Technology 

The system was custom designed by Poma-Otis Transportation Systems, a joint venture between Otis Elevator Company and Poma that has since been dissolved. Installation was performed by Otis, who currently operates and maintains the system.

(The same "Hovair" technology is used in the Hub Tram and the Cincinnati Airport People Mover)  Each tram is made up of two cars and can carry up to 208 passengers at a time.

LED displays in the stations, and in the trams, provide information, such as the upcoming stops, supplemented with a pre-recorded male voice which delivers audio information and warnings.

Route 

The ExpressTram services three stations along Concourse A.  The stations at the ends of the concourse are appropriately named the North Station (which serves gates A56-A78) and the South Station (which serves gates A1-A28). The center station serves gates A29-A55, Luggage Claim, Ground Transportation, and Concourses B and C. The center station is officially known as the Terminal Station, based upon its close proximity to the main terminal building, which houses baggage claim, airline check-in counters, and ground transportation facilities. A maintenance garage lies beyond the North Station.

The system's primary infrastructure consists of a single guide-way. At the Terminal station, a bypass guideway splits from the main guideway allowing the two trams to pass each other. The Terminal station has an island platform between the main guideway and the bypass. Operating software attempts to keep the trams synchronized, so that the trams arrive at the Center Station simultaneously, but this is not essential. In the event that trams lose synchronization, as is frequently the case with passenger induced delays, the first tram to arrive at the Center station will be held until the opposite tram enters the bypass area, providing a clear path for the waiting tram.

See also 
Transportation in metropolitan Detroit

References 

 Overhead Tram Ferries Travelers (Detroit News)
 Detroit Metropolitan Wayne County Airport Chronological History
 Detroit's McNamara Terminal Opens For Business (Associated Press)
  Wayne County Airport Authority

External links 
 ExpressTram Video #1 (YouTube)
 ExpressTram Video #2 (YouTube)

Airport people mover systems in the United States
Transportation in Detroit
Hovair people movers